Fernando Muñagorri (3 August 1907 – 10 November 1959) was a Spanish sprinter. He competed in the men's 100 metres at the 1928 Summer Olympics.

References

External links
 

1907 births
1959 deaths
Athletes (track and field) at the 1928 Summer Olympics
Spanish male sprinters
Olympic athletes of Spain
Place of birth missing
Sportspeople from Gipuzkoa
Athletes from the Basque Country (autonomous community)